"Tú" is a song performed by the Puerto Rican singer Noelia, taken from her debut studio album of the same name (1999). The song was released as her debut single and it was written by Estéfano with minor uncredited lyrics by Noelia. The song reached No. 5 on the Billboard Hot Latin Tracks chart, becoming her most successful singles on that chart and it is her signature song. "Tú" received a nomination for Pop Song of the Year at the 2000 Lo Nuestro Awards. It was acknowledged as an award-winning song at the 2000 BMI Latin Awards.

Charts

Weekly charts

Year-end charts

Cover versions
The song was covered by Norteño singer Carín León in 2021. Noelia disapproved the version because he did not pay royalties for it. Andrea Mireille described it for Chilango as a Regional Mexican acoustic song.

References

1999 debut singles
1999 songs
Spanish-language songs
Songs written by Estéfano
1990s ballads
Fonovisa Records singles